Elina Svitolina defeated Sloane Stephens in the final, 3–6, 6–2, 6–2 to win the singles tennis title at the 2018 WTA Finals.

Caroline Wozniacki was the defending champion, but was eliminated in the round-robin stage.

Naomi Osaka, Stephens, and Kiki Bertens made their debuts in the event. 

This was the first time that the top four seeds were eliminated in the round robin stage, leaving the fifth to eighth seeds to qualify for the semifinals.

Seeds

Notes:
  Simona Halep had qualified but withdrew due to back injury

Alternates

Draw

Finals

Red group

† Following WTA rules, Osaka's retirement against Bertens was counted as a straight-set loss in determining round robin standings.

White group

Standings are determined by: 1. number of wins; 2. number of matches; 3. in two-player ties, head-to-head records; 4. in three-player ties, (a) percentage of sets won (head-to-head records if two players remain tied), then (b) percentage of games won (head-to-head records if two players remain tied), then (c) WTA rankings.

References
Main Draw

2018 Singles
Finals